Vice Admiral Shahin Sultanov was the Commander of the Azerbaijani Naval Forces from 1999 to 2014.

Early life and career
He was born on 8 August 1961 in the Goychay District of the Azerbaijan SSR. Sultanov graduated from the Navigation Department of the Caspian Higher Naval School named after Sergei Kirov.

He was appointed the Commander of Azerbaijani Naval Forces in 1999. Sultanov's rank was raised to Counter Admiral on January 19, 2002. On June 24, 2005 he was promoted to Vice Admiral. He was awarded with Veten Ughrunda Medal (In the Name of Motherland) on June 24, 2003; Azerbaijani Flag Order on June 22, 2006; Herbi Xidmlete Gore Medal on June 24, 2010.

As the commander of navy, he modernized the Azerbaijani Navy capabilities and established close contacts with the Turkish Navy and Pakistani Navy.

Arrest
Sultanov was arrested on 24 April 2014 on charges of official forgery, theft and embezzlement and as a preventive measure was later placed under house arrest. A military court in the Nəsimi raion sentenced hun to eight years and six months in prison with a probationary period of three years. According to his lawyer, the court's decision to move Sultanov’s was based in his merit’s in the military.

See also
Azerbaijani Army
Ministers of Defense of Azerbaijan Republic
General Staff of Azerbaijani Armed Forces

References

Azerbaijani generals
Chiefs of General Staff of Azerbaijani Armed Forces
Living people
Recipients of the Azerbaijani Flag Order
People from Goychay District
1959 births
Azerbaijani Navy personnel